Lechazo de Castilla y León is a protected-origin food product in the European Union consisting of milk-fed lamb meat, produced in Castile and León (Spain). The Geographical indication (GI) was authorized in 1997. The GI encompasses 483 farms from all of the grain-producing counties of Castilla y León, producing more than 167,000 lechazos per year. The Indicación Geográfica Protegida (I.G.P.) Council headquarters is located in Zamora, Spain. 

The Spanish term lechazo refers to a young sheep that is still suckling. Per the I.G.P., lechazo de Castilla y León must be of the Churra, Castellana or Ojalada breeds, and the lambs must have been fed only their mothers' milk. Lechazo meat is a highly esteemed delicacy in the region. Roast lamb and lamb chops are a prized traditional food in Castile, and a widespread dish in the region's restaurants and taverns.

Requirements at time of slaughter
 Live weight from 9 kg to 12 kg.
 Age of slaughter: up to 35 days

See also
 
 List of lamb dishes
 Spanish cuisine
 Castilian-Leonese cuisine
 Cuisine of the province of Valladolid

References

External links 
http://www.lechazodecastillayleon.es/

Ancient dishes
Spanish cuisine